Stenomicra angustata is a species of fly in the family Periscelididae.

References

Periscelididae
Articles created by Qbugbot
Insects described in 1900